Victoria Herazo (born June 2, 1959) is an American racewalker. She competed in the women's 10 kilometres walk at the 1992 Summer Olympics and the 1996 Summer Olympics.

References

External links
 

1959 births
Living people
Athletes (track and field) at the 1992 Summer Olympics
Athletes (track and field) at the 1996 Summer Olympics
American female racewalkers
Olympic track and field athletes of the United States
Place of birth missing (living people)
21st-century American women